Derwent Lees (14 November 1884 – 24 March 1931) was an Australian landscape painter.

Biography
Derwent Lees was born Desmond Lees in Hobart, Australia, in 1884. His father was general manager of the Union Bank of Australia. He suffered a head injury and lost a foot in a riding accident as a youth, while studying at Melbourne Grammar School in 1899–1900. Afterwards, he wore a wooden prosthetic. Following a brief stay in Paris, he moved to London in 1905 and studied at the Slade School of Fine Art with Henry Tonks and Frederick Brown. He joined its staff in 1908 while still a student, and remained there, on and off, for ten years.

He was a member of the New English Art Club from 1911. The earliest known pencil work of a model is from 1909 while at the Slade school and is held in a private collection in Doreen, Victoria, Australia. He also exhibited at the Goupil Galleries and the Chenil Gallery in Chelsea. His work was shown in the Twentieth Century Art Review Exhibition of 1914 and the Armory Show in New York, where he was the only Australian artist represented.

He was a friend of Augustus John and James Dickson Innes, and spent the period from late 1910 to 1912 with them at a cottage called Nant Ddu in north Wales. He married his wife, Edith Harriet Price (1890-1984), in 1913. Under the name "Lyndra", she was one of Augustus John's former models. In 1912 Innes and Lees went on another painting trip to Collioure in France. This was shortly after the beginning of the Fauvist movement and he is the only Australian artist known to have had any connection with them.

His artistic career was curtailed by a mental health problem, diagnosed as schizophrenia in 1912, which eventually saw him confined to asylums in Surrey from 1918 until his death in 1931 at West Park Hospital, Epsom.

In 1936 his work 'Dorset Scene' was exhibited posthumously in the Venice Biennale by Great Britain.

Selected paintings

Works in collections

References

Further reading
 Derwent Lees, "Drawings", The Blue Review, Vol. I No. I (May, 1913).
 Alleyne Zander, "Derwent Lees", Art in Australia, series 3, no. 48, Feb 1933.
 Eric Rowan, Some miraculous promised land: J. D. Innes, Augustus John and Derwent Lees in North Wales 1910–13, Llandudno: Mostyn Art Gallery, 1982.
 Merlin James, "Derwent Lees", The London Magazine, Feb/Mar 1992.
 Henry R. Lew, In Search of Derwent Lees, privately published by Henry R. Lew, North Caulfield, Victoria, Australia. 1996. .
 Henry R. Lew, "J.D. Innes and Derwent Lees", The Australasian Antique Collector, Dec 1997–June 1998.
 Henry R. Lew, "Imaging the World", Hybrid Publishers, 2018, Chapter 12 Derwent Lees.

External links

More works by Lees @ ArtNet
Derwent Lees @ Epsom and Ewell History Explorer

1880s births
1931 deaths
20th-century Australian painters
20th-century Australian male artists
Australian male painters